In mathematics, mollifiers (also known as approximations to the identity) are smooth functions with special properties, used for example in distribution theory to create sequences of smooth functions approximating nonsmooth (generalized) functions, via convolution. Intuitively, given a function which is rather irregular, by convolving it with a mollifier the function gets "mollified", that is, its sharp features are smoothed, while still remaining close to the original nonsmooth (generalized) function. 

They are also known as Friedrichs mollifiers after Kurt Otto Friedrichs, who introduced them.

Historical notes 

Mollifiers were introduced by Kurt Otto Friedrichs in his paper , which is considered a watershed in the modern theory of partial differential equations. The name of this mathematical object had a curious genesis, and Peter Lax tells the whole story  in his commentary on that paper published in Friedrichs' "Selecta". According to him, at that time, the mathematician Donald Alexander Flanders was a colleague of Friedrichs: since he liked to consult colleagues about English usage, he asked Flanders an advice on how to name the smoothing operator he was using. Flanders was a puritan, nicknamed by his friends Moll after Moll Flanders in recognition of his moral qualities: he suggested to call the new mathematical concept a "mollifier" as a pun incorporating both Flanders' nickname and the verb 'to mollify', meaning 'to smooth over' in a figurative sense.

Previously, Sergei Sobolev used mollifiers in his epoch making 1938 paper, which contains the proof of the Sobolev embedding theorem: Friedrichs himself acknowledged Sobolev's work on mollifiers stating that:-"These mollifiers were introduced by Sobolev and the author...".

It must be pointed out that the term "mollifier" has undergone linguistic drift since the time of these foundational works: Friedrichs defined as "mollifier" the integral operator whose kernel is one of the functions nowadays called mollifiers. However, since the properties of a linear integral operator are completely determined by its kernel, the name mollifier was inherited by the kernel itself as a result of common usage.

Definition

Modern (distribution based) definition 
 If  is a smooth function on ℝn, n ≥ 1, satisfying the following three requirements

 it is compactly supported   

where  is the Dirac delta function and the limit must be understood in the space of Schwartz distributions, then  is a mollifier. The function  could also satisfy further conditions: for example, if it satisfies

 ≥ 0 for all x ∈ ℝn, then it is called a positive mollifier
= for some infinitely differentiable function  : ℝ+ → ℝ, then it is called a symmetric mollifier

Notes on Friedrichs' definition
Note 1. This also clarifies why mollifiers are related to approximate identities.

Note 2. As briefly pointed out in the "Historical notes" section of this entry, originally, the term "mollifier" identified the following convolution operator:

Concrete example 
Consider the bump function  of a variable in ℝn defined by

where the numerical constant  ensures normalization.

Properties 
All properties of a mollifier are related to its behaviour under the operation of convolution: we list the following ones, whose proofs can be found in every text on distribution theory.

Smoothing property
For any distribution , the following family of convolutions indexed by the real number 

where  denotes convolution, is a family of smooth functions.

Approximation of identity
For any distribution , the following family of convolutions indexed by the real number  converges to

Support of convolution
For any distribution ,

where  indicates the support in the sense of distributions, and  indicates their Minkowski addition.

Applications 
The basic application of mollifiers is to prove that properties valid for smooth functions are also valid in nonsmooth situations:

Product of distributions 

defines (if it exists) their product in various theories of generalized functions.

"Weak=Strong" theorems 
Very informally, mollifiers are used to prove the identity of two different kind of extension of differential operators: the strong extension and the weak extension. The paper  illustrates this concept quite well: however the high number of technical details needed to show what this really means prevent them from being formally detailed in this short description.

Smooth cutoff functions 

This can be seen easily by observing that if  ≤  and  ≤  then  ≤ . Hence for  ≤ ,
.
One can see how this construction can be generalized to obtain a smooth function identical to one on a neighbourhood of a given compact set, and equal to zero in every point whose distance from this set is greater than a given . Such a function is called a (smooth) cutoff function: those functions are used to eliminate singularities of a given (generalized) function by multiplication. They leave unchanged the value of the (generalized) function they multiply only on a given set, thus modifying its support: also cutoff functions are the basic parts of smooth partitions of unity.

See also

 Approximate identity
 Bump function
 Convolution
 Distribution (mathematics)
 Generalized function
 Kurt Otto Friedrichs
 Non-analytic smooth function
 Sergei Sobolev
 Weierstrass transform

Notes

References 
. The first paper where mollifiers were introduced.
. A paper where the differentiability of solutions of elliptic partial differential equations is investigated by using mollifiers.
. A selection from Friedrichs' works with a biography and commentaries of David Isaacson, Fritz John, Tosio Kato, Peter Lax, Louis Nirenberg, Wolfgag Wasow, Harold Weitzner.
.
.
. The paper where Sergei Sobolev proved his embedding theorem, introducing and using integral operators very similar to mollifiers, without naming them.

Functional analysis
Smooth functions
Schwartz distributions